John M. Mercanti (born April 27, 1943) is an American sculptor and engraver. He was the twelfth Chief Engraver of the United States Mint until his retirement in late 2010.

Biography
Mercanti was born in Philadelphia. There, he attended the Pennsylvania Academy of Fine Arts, the Philadelphia College of Art and the Fleisher Art Memorial School. He also served in the Pennsylvania Army National Guard for six years.

In 1974, Mercanti joined the United States Mint as a sculptor-engraver after working as an illustrator. On May 19, 2006, he was appointed Chief Engraver of the U.S. Mint (also known as Supervisor of Design and Master Tooling Development Specialist). The position had been officially vacant for 15 years following the retirement of Elizabeth Jones, the Mint's eleventh Chief Engraver, in 1991.

In June 2011, Mercanti became a paid spokesperson for Goldline International and appeared in a television commercial for the company.

In 2021, Mercanti was named one of Coin World's Most Influential People in Numismatics (1960-2020).

Work

Mercanti has produced more coin and medal designs than any employee in United States Mint history (more than 100 as of 2006). Among these are the 1984 Olympic gold ten-dollar coin, the 1986 Statue of Liberty dollar coin, the 1989 Congress Bicentennial gold five-dollar coin, the obverse of the 1990 Eisenhower Centennial silver dollar, the obverse of the 1991 Mount Rushmore five-dollar coin, the obverse of the 1991 Korean War Memorial silver dollar, and the obverse of the 2005 John Marshall commemorative dollar. In addition to designing and sculpting a number of Congressional Gold Medals, Mercanti worked on quarters for the states of Arkansas, Iowa, North Carolina, Pennsylvania, and West Virginia for the 50 State Quarters Program.

References

United States Mint engravers
University of the Arts (Philadelphia) alumni
Artists from Philadelphia
Living people
1943 births
South Philadelphia High School alumni
Sculptors from Pennsylvania
American people of Italian descent